Dospat Peak is a  mountain peak in the Vidin Heights on Varna Peninsula, Livingston Island, part of the South Shetland Islands off the coast of Antarctica. The peak is named after the town of Dospat in the Rhodope Mountains, Bulgaria.

Location
(Bulgarian mapping in 2005 and 2009 from the Tangra 2004/05 topographic survey.)

Maps
 L.L. Ivanov et al. Antarctica: Livingston Island and Greenwich Island, South Shetland Islands. Scale 1:100000 topographic map. Sofia: Antarctic Place-names Commission of Bulgaria, 2005.
 L.L. Ivanov. Antarctica: Livingston Island and Greenwich, Robert, Snow and Smith Islands. Scale 1:120000 topographic map.  Troyan: Manfred Wörner Foundation, 2009.

External links
 Dospat Peak. SCAR Composite Antarctic Gazetteer
 Bulgarian Antarctic Gazetteer. Antarctic Place-names Commission. (details in Bulgarian, basic data in English)

External links
 Dospat Peak. Copernix satellite image

Mountains of Livingston Island